Rhyssinae is a subfamily of parasitoid wasps in the family Ichneumonidae. It contains eight genera and 259 described species, but there are likely many undiscovered species.

Genera
The following genera belong to the subfamily Rhyssinae:
 Cyrtorhyssa Baltazar, 1961 i c g
 Epirhyssa Cresson, 1865 i c g b
 Lytarmes Cameron, 1899 i c g
 Megarhyssa Ashmead, 1900 i c g b
 Myllenyxis Baltazar, 1961 i c g
 Rhyssa Gravenhorst, 1829 i c g b
 Rhyssella Rohwer, 1920 i c g b
 Triancyra Baltazar, 1961 i c g
Data sources: i = ITIS, c = Catalogue of Life, g = GBIF, b = Bugguide.net

References

Further reading

External links

 

Parasitic wasps
Ichneumonidae